The 2007 Williamstown state by-election was a by-election held on 15 September 2007 for the Victorian Legislative Assembly electorate of Williamstown in suburban Melbourne.

The by-election was triggered when Steve Bracks, the Labor Party member for Williamstown and outgoing Premier of Victoria, resigned from politics on 30 July 2007. Bracks had held the seat since 1994, and had been leader of the state Labor Party since 1999, serving as Premier from 1999 to 2007. Williamstown is generally considered a safe seat for the ALP, and Bracks' predecessor in the seat, Joan Kirner, was also a former Premier.

With the resignation of Premier Steve Bracks on 30 July 2007, a by-election was required. On 4 August 2007 Janet Rice was confirmed to be the candidate for The Greens, the previous day (3 August 2007) the Liberal Party had confirmed that they would not run a candidate. This left Janet Rice as the person most likely to displace an ALP candidate, although she would need to greatly improve upon the vote that the Greens received in the 2006 state election. Former Transport Workers Union of Australia assistant secretary Wade Noonan held the seat for Labor.

Results

Notes

Victorian state by-elections
2007 elections in Australia
2000s in Victoria (Australia)